Florey is a lunar impact crater on the lunar near side near the northern pole. Florey is directly adjacent to Byrd crater (diameter of 94 km) to the Southeast and Peary crater (diameter of 73 km) to the North. The crater is named after Australian scientist Howard Florey. The crater was named by the IAU in 2009.

References

External links
 LAC-1 area - Map of northern lunar pole

LQ01 quadrangle
Impact craters on the Moon